Barbara Hendricks (born November 20, 1948) is an American operatic soprano and concert singer. Hendricks has lived in Europe since 1977, and in Switzerland in Basel since 1985. She is a citizen of Sweden following her marriage to a Swedish citizen.

Early life and education
Hendricks was born in Stephens, Arkansas. Growing up, she sang and took voice lessons and was often asked to sing solos. She graduated from the University of Nebraska–Lincoln with a bachelor's degree in mathematics and chemistry at the age of 20. She attended the Aspen Music Festival and School and then attended Juilliard School of Music in New York, where she studied with mezzo-soprano Jennie Tourel and participated in master classes led by soprano Maria Callas. She graduated with a bachelor's degree in music.

Musical career
In 1974, Hendricks made her professional operatic debut in Europe at the Glyndebourne Festival and in America at the San Francisco Opera. During her career, she has appeared at major opera houses throughout the world, including the Opéra National de Paris, the Metropolitan Opera, the Royal Opera House, Covent Garden, and La Scala. In 1998 she sang Liù in the historical performance of Turandot at the Forbidden City in Beijing. Hendricks has performed more than twenty roles, twelve of which she has recorded.

Hendricks has appeared on film as Mimì in La bohème, and in 1995 she sang the role of Anne Truelove in the Swedish film Rucklarens väg, an adaptation of Stravinsky's opera The Rake's Progress. In 2007, she appeared in the film Disengagement by Amos Gitai and starring Juliette Binoche. She also recorded Mahler's Das Lied von der Erde, which is the main theme for the film.

Hendricks also performs jazz music and made her jazz debut at the Montreux Jazz Festival in 1994. Since that time, she has performed at major jazz festivals around the world. Hendricks is also known for her love of chamber music and has organized a number of chamber music festivals.

In 2004, at the Théâtre du Châtelet in Paris, she created the role of Angel in the world premiere of Péter Eötvös' opera Angels in America, after the play by Tony Kushner.

In January 2006, she left EMI, and created the new label Arte Verum for which she records exclusively.

In 2018, Hendricks sang "La Marseillaise" with the Choir of the French Army at the interment ceremony of Simone Veil in the Panthéon.

Humanitarian work

Since 2000, Hendricks has been a member of the Council of the Foundation for the Refugee Education Trust (RET). The RET is dedicated to post-primary education of refugee youth all over the world.

In 1991 and 1993 Hendricks gave two concerts in the war-torn formerly Yugoslavian cities of Dubrovnik and Sarajevo. She performed in Sarajevo  with the Sarajevo Opera Chorus and jazz musician Sinan Alimanović. In 1998 she founded the Barbara Hendricks Foundation for Peace and Reconciliation, which seeks to facilitate reconciliation where conflicts have already occurred.

In 2001 she performed at the Nobel Prize ceremony in Oslo at the invitation of Nobel Peace Prize Laureate Kofi Annan. In May 2002, she performed at the East Timor Independence Day Ceremony.

Awards
In 1986, Hendricks was made a Commandeur of the Ordre des Arts et des Lettres; in 1992 she was awarded the rank of Chevalier of the Légion d'honneur. In 2000, she was awarded the Prince of Asturias Award for the Arts. In 2001, Hendricks received the Lions Clubs International Award for the work of her foundation. In 2015, Hendricks received the honorary degree Doctor of Fine Arts from the University of Nebraska-Lincoln.

References
Notes

Sources
 Adapted from the article Barbara Hendricks , from Wikinfo, licensed under the GNU Free Documentation License.

External links

[ AllMusic biography]
Interview

Interview with Studs Terkel, April 3, 1978

20th-century African-American women singers
20th-century American women opera singers
African-American women opera singers
American operatic sopranos
Swedish operatic sopranos
American women jazz singers
American jazz singers
Swedish jazz singers
Aspen Music Festival and School alumni
People from Stephens, Arkansas
University of Nebraska–Lincoln alumni
United Nations High Commissioner for Refugees Goodwill Ambassadors
Commandeurs of the Ordre des Arts et des Lettres
Chevaliers of the Légion d'honneur
1948 births
Living people
Jazz musicians from Arkansas
21st-century Swiss women opera singers
21st-century American women